South Carolina Highway 116 (SC 116) was a state highway that existed entirely in the southwestern part of Lexington County. It existed partially within the city limits of Leesville (now part of Batesburg–Leesville.

Route description
SC 116 began at an intersection with U.S. Route 1 (US 1) in Leesville. It traveled to the southeast and reached its eastern terminus, an intersection with SC 113 (now Pond Branch Road and Juniper Springs Road) south-southeast of Gilbert.

History
SC 116 was established in 1940. It was decommissioned in 1947. Its path was downgraded to a secondary road. Today, it is known as East Avenue and Pond Branch Road.

Major intersections

See also

References

External links
Former SC 116 at the Virginia Highways South Carolina Annex

116
Transportation in Lexington County, South Carolina